Leslie Johnson may refer to:
Leslie Johnson (racing driver) (1912–1959), British racing driver
Leslie Johnson (councilwoman), Prince George's County, Maryland politician
Leslie Peter Johnson (born 1930), English philologist
Les Johnson (Leslie Royston Johnson, 1924–2015), Australian politician, minister and High Commissioner
Les Johnson (diplomat) (1916–2000), Australian public servant and diplomat
Les Johnson (footballer, born 1903) (1903–1979), Australian rules footballer for Carlton
Les Johnson (footballer, born 1917) (1917–1994), Australian rules footballer for Footscray